Zyad Jusić (born 29 February 1980) is a Bosnian-Dutch former professional footballer who played as a striker.

Early and personal life
Jusić was born in Ljubovija, then a part of SFR Yugoslavia, and he holds dual Bosnian-Dutch citizenship.

Club career
After beginning as a youth player with PSV, Jusić began his senior career with FC Eindhoven, scoring 12 goals in 66 games over three seasons. Jusić later played in Belgium for a number of teams including Dessel, KFC Lille, Turnhout, Capellen and Geel.

References

1980 births
Living people
People from Ljubovija
Dutch people of Bosnia and Herzegovina descent
Association football forwards
Bosnia and Herzegovina footballers
Dutch footballers
FC Eindhoven players
K.F.C. Dessel Sport players
KFC Turnhout players
Royal Cappellen F.C. players
Eerste Divisie players
Bosnia and Herzegovina expatriate footballers
Expatriate footballers in Belgium
Bosnia and Herzegovina expatriate sportspeople in Belgium